Ekwereazu (or Ekwerazu) is a town in Mbaise, Imo State, Nigeria. It is made up of six communities: Oparanadim, Mpam, Ihitteafoukwu, Umuokirika, Obohia and Ekwereazu Town.

References

Towns in Imo State